Lev Vasilyevich Platonov (born 10 May 1940) is a Russian professional football coach and a former player.

Coaching career
The highest level he managed at was the second-tier 1999 Russian First Division and 2000 Russian First Division with FC Kristall Smolensk.

Later he managed FC Terek Grozny early in the 2002 season of the Russian Second Division. Terek was promoted to the Russian First Division at the end of the season, Platonov was replaced as a manager by that time.

References

External links
 

1940 births
Sportspeople from Ryazan
Living people
Soviet footballers
Soviet football managers
Russian football managers
FC Akhmat Grozny managers
FC Iskra Smolensk players
Association footballers not categorized by position
FC Spartak Ryazan players